1946 Meistaradeildin was the fourth season of Meistaradeildin, the top tier of the Faroese football league system. The teams were separated in three groups based on geographical criteria. B36 Tórshavn defeated VB Vágur 3–1 in the championship final.

Qualifying round

East

West
SÍ played only once.

South
Both teams advanced.

|}

Semifinals
Match played on 4 August.

|}

Final
The match was played on 18 August.

|}

References

External links
Faroe Islands Premier League at Faroe Soccer (choose 1946)
RSSSF

Meistaradeildin seasons
Faroe
Faroe